The study of fluid mechanics, a branch of physics that studies the movement of fluids and the forces that act upon them, dates back to pre-history. The Ancient Greeks developed many of the basics of the field, while most concepts and theories used in modern physics were discovered in 17th and 18th century Europe.

Antiquity

Pre-history

A pragmatic, if not scientific, knowledge of fluid flow was exhibited by ancient civilizations, such as in the design of arrows, spears, boats, and particularly hydraulic engineering projects for flood protection, irrigation, drainage, and water supply.  The earliest human civilizations began near the shores of rivers, and consequently coincided with the dawn of hydrology, hydraulics, and hydraulic engineering.

Archimedes

The fundamental principles of hydrostatics and dynamics were given by Archimedes in his work On Floating Bodies, around 250 BC.  In it, Archimedes develops the law of buoyancy, also known as Archimedes' Principle.  This principle states that a body immersed in a fluid experiences a buoyant force equal to the weight of the fluid it displaces.  Archimedes maintained that each particle of a fluid mass, when in equilibrium, is equally pressed in every direction; and he inquired into the conditions according to which a solid body floating in a fluid should assume and preserve a position of equilibrium.

The Alexandrian school
In the Greek school at Alexandria, which flourished under the auspices of the Ptolemies, attempts were made at the construction of hydraulic machinery, and about 120 BC the fountain of compression, the siphon, and the forcing-pump were invented by Ctesibius and Hero. The siphon is a simple instrument; but the forcing-pump is a complicated invention, which could scarcely have been expected in the infancy of hydraulics. It was probably suggested to Ctesibius by the Egyptian wheel or Noria, which was common at that time, and which was a kind of chain pump, consisting of a number of earthen pots carried round by a wheel. In some of these machines the pots have a valve in the bottom which enables them to descend without much resistance, and diminishes greatly the load upon the wheel; and, if we suppose that this valve was introduced so early as the time of Ctesibius, it is not difficult to perceive how such a machine might have led to the invention of the forcing-pump.

Sextus Julius Frontinus
Notwithstanding these inventions of the Alexandrian school, its attention does not seem to have been directed to the motion of fluids; and the first attempt to investigate this subject was made by Sextus Julius Frontinus, inspector of the public fountains at Rome in the reigns of Nerva and Trajan. In his work De aquaeductibus urbis Romae commentarius, he considers the methods which were at that time employed for ascertaining the quantity of water discharged from ajutages (tubes), and the mode of distributing the waters of an aqueduct or a fountain. He remarked that the flow of water from an orifice depends not only on the magnitude of the orifice itself, but also on the height of the water in the reservoir; and that a pipe employed to carry off a portion of water from an aqueduct should, as circumstances required, have a position more or less inclined to the original direction of the current. But as he was unacquainted with the law of the velocities of running water as depending upon the depth of the orifice, the want of precision which appears in his results is not surprising.

Middle Ages

Islamicate physicists

Islamicate scientists, particularly Abu Rayhan Biruni (973–1048) and later Al-Khazini (fl. 1115–1130), were the first to apply experimental scientific methods to fluid mechanics, especially in the field of fluid statics, such as for determining specific weights.  They applied the mathematical theories of ratios and infinitesimal techniques, and introduced algebraic and fine calculation techniques into the field of fluid statics.

In fluid statics, Biruni discovered that there is a correlation between the specific gravity of an object and the volume of water it displaces. He also introduced the method of checking tests during experiments and measured the weights of various liquids. He also recorded the differences in weight between freshwater and saline water, and between hot water and cold water. During his experiments on fluid mechanics, Biruni invented the conical measure, in order to find the ratio between the weight of a substance in air and the weight of water displaced.

Al-Khazini, in The Book of the Balance of Wisdom (1121), invented a hydrostatic balance.

Islamicate engineers

In the 9th century, Banū Mūsā brothers' Book of Ingenious Devices described a number of early automatic controls in fluid mechanics. Two-step level controls for fluids, an early form of discontinuous variable structure controls, was developed by the Banu Musa brothers. They also described an early feedback controller for fluids. According to Donald Routledge Hill, the Banu Musa brothers were "masters in the exploitation of small variations" in hydrostatic pressures and in using conical valves as "in-line" components in flow systems, "the first known use of conical valves as automatic controllers." They also described the use of other valves, including a plug valve, float valve and tap. The Banu Musa also developed an early fail-safe system where "one can withdraw small quantities of liquid repeatedly, but if one withdraws a large quantity, no further extractions are possible." The double-concentric siphon and the funnel with bent end for pouring in different liquids, neither of which appear in any earlier Greek works, were also original inventions by the Banu Musa brothers. Some of the other mechanisms they described include a float chamber and an early differential pressure.

In 1206, Al-Jazari's Book of Knowledge of Ingenious Mechanical Devices described many hydraulic machines. Of particular importance were his water-raising pumps. The first known use of a crankshaft in a chain pump was in one of al-Jazari's saqiya machines. The concept of minimizing intermittent working is also first implied in one of al-Jazari's saqiya chain pumps, which was for the purpose of maximising the efficiency of the saqiya chain pump. Al-Jazari also invented a twin-cylinder reciprocating piston suction pump, which included the first suction pipes, suction pumping, double-action pumping, and made early uses of valves and a crankshaft-connecting rod mechanism. This pump is remarkable for three reasons: the first known use of a true suction pipe (which sucks fluids into a partial vacuum) in a pump, the first application of the double-acting principle, and the conversion of rotary to reciprocating motion, via the crankshaft-connecting rod mechanism.

Seventeenth and eighteenth centuries

Castelli and Torricelli
Benedetto Castelli, and Evangelista Torricelli, two of the disciples of Galileo, applied the discoveries of their master to the science of hydrodynamics. In 1628 Castelli published a small work, Della misura dell' acque correnti, in which he satisfactorily explained several phenomena in the motion of fluids in rivers and canals; but he committed a great paralogism in supposing the velocity of the water proportional to the depth of the orifice below the surface of the vessel. Torricelli, observing that in a jet where the water rushed through a small ajutage it rose to nearly the same height with the reservoir from which it was supplied, imagined that it ought to move with the same velocity as if it had fallen through that height by the force of gravity, and hence he deduced the proposition that the velocities of liquids are as the square root of the head, apart from the resistance of the air and the friction of the orifice. This theorem was published in 1643, at the end of his treatise De motu gravium projectorum, and it was confirmed by the experiments of Raffaello Magiotti on the quantities of water discharged from different ajutages under different pressures (1648).

Blaise Pascal
In the hands of Blaise Pascal hydrostatics assumed the dignity of a science, and in a treatise on the equilibrium of liquids (Sur l’équilibre des liqueurs), found among his manuscripts after his death and published in 1663, the laws of the equilibrium of liquids were demonstrated in the most simple manner, and amply confirmed by experiments.

Mariotte and Guglielmini
The theorem of Torricelli was employed by many succeeding writers, but particularly by Edme Mariotte (1620–1684), whose Traité du mouvement des eaux, published after his death in the year 1686, is founded on a great variety of well-conducted experiments on the motion of fluids, performed at Versailles and Chantilly. In the discussion of some points he committed considerable mistakes. Others he treated very superficially, and in none of his experiments apparently did he attend to the diminution of efflux arising from the contraction of the liquid vein, when the orifice is merely a perforation in a thin plate; but he appears to have been the first who attempted to ascribe the discrepancy between theory and experiment to the retardation of the water's velocity through friction. His contemporary Domenico Guglielmini (1655–1710), who was inspector of the rivers and canals at Bologna, had ascribed this diminution of velocity in rivers to transverse motions arising from inequalities in their bottom. But as Mariotte observed similar obstructions even in glass pipes where no transverse currents could exist, the cause assigned by Guglielmini seemed destitute of foundation. The French philosopher, therefore, regarded these obstructions as the effects of friction. He supposed that the filaments of water which graze along the sides of the pipe lose a portion of their velocity; that the contiguous filaments, having on this account a greater velocity, rub upon the former, and suffer a diminution of their celerity; and that the other filaments are affected with similar retardations proportional to their distance from the axis of the pipe. In this way the medium velocity of the current may be diminished, and consequently the quantity of water discharged in a given time must, from the effects of friction, be considerably less than that which is computed from theory.

Studies by Isaac Newton

Friction and viscosity
The effects of friction and viscosity in diminishing the velocity of running water were noticed in the Principia of Sir Isaac Newton, who threw much light upon several branches of hydromechanics. At a time when the Cartesian system of vortices universally prevailed, he found it necessary to investigate that hypothesis, and in the course of his investigations he showed that the velocity of any stratum of the vortex is an arithmetical mean between the velocities of the strata which enclose it; and from this it evidently follows that the velocity of a filament of water moving in a pipe is an arithmetical mean between the velocities of the filaments which surround it. Taking advantage of these results, Italian-born French engineer Henri Pitot afterwards showed that the retardations arising from friction are inversely as the diameters of the pipes in which the fluid moves.

Orifices
The attention of Newton was also directed to the discharge of water from orifices in the bottom of vessels. He supposed a cylindrical vessel full of water to be perforated in its bottom with a small hole by which the water escaped, and the vessel to be supplied with water in such a manner that it always remained full at the same height. He then supposed this cylindrical column of water to be divided into two parts – the first, which he called the "cataract," being an hyperboloid generated by the revolution of an hyperbola of the fifth degree around the axis of the cylinder which should pass through the orifice, and the second the remainder of the water in the cylindrical vessel. He considered the horizontal strata of this hyperboloid as always in motion, while the remainder of the water was in a state of rest, and imagined that there was a kind of cataract in the middle of the fluid.

When the results of this theory were compared with the quantity of water actually discharged, Newton concluded that the velocity with which the water issued from the orifice was equal to that which a falling body would receive by descending through half the height of water in the reservoir. This conclusion, however, is absolutely irreconcilable with the known fact that jets of water rise nearly to the same height as their reservoirs, and Newton seems to have been aware of this objection. Accordingly, in the second edition of his Principia, which appeared in 1713, he reconsidered his theory. He had discovered a contraction in the vein of fluid (vena contracta) which issued from the orifice, and found that, at the distance of about a diameter of the aperture, the section of the vein was contracted in the subduplicate ratio of two to one. He regarded, therefore, the section of the contracted vein as the true orifice from which the discharge of water ought to be deduced, and the velocity of the effluent water as due to the whole height of water in the reservoir; and by this means his theory became more conformable to the results of experience, though still open to serious objections.

Waves
Newton was also the first to investigate the difficult subject of the motion of waves.

Daniel Bernoulli
In 1738 Daniel Bernoulli published his Hydrodynamica seu de viribus et motibus fluidorum commentarii. His theory of the motion of fluids, the germ of which was first published in his memoir entitled Theoria nova de motu aquarum per canales quocunque fluentes, communicated to the academy of St Petersburg as early as 1726, was founded on two suppositions, which appeared to him conformable to experience. He supposed that the surface of the fluid, contained in a vessel which is emptying itself by an orifice, remains always horizontal; and, if the fluid mass is conceived to be divided into an infinite number of horizontal strata of the same bulk, that these strata remain contiguous to each other, and that all their points descend vertically, with velocities inversely proportional to their breadth, or to the horizontal sections of the reservoir. In order to determine the motion of each stratum, he employed the principle of the conservatio virium vivarum, and obtained very elegant solutions. But in the absence of a general demonstration of that principle, his results did not command the confidence which they would otherwise have deserved, and it became desirable to have a theory more certain, and depending solely on the fundamental laws of mechanics. Colin Maclaurin and John Bernoulli, who were of this opinion, resolved the problem by more direct methods, the one in his Fluxions, published in 1742, and the other in his Hydraulica nunc primum detecta, et demonstrata directe ex fundamentis pure mechanicis, which forms the fourth volume of his works. The method employed by Maclaurin has been thought not sufficiently rigorous; and that of John Bernoulli is, in the opinion of Lagrange, defective in clearness and precision.

Jean le Rond d'Alembert
The theory of Daniel Bernoulli was opposed also by Jean le Rond d'Alembert. When generalizing the theory of pendulums of Jacob Bernoulli he discovered a principle of dynamics so simple and general that it reduced the laws of the motions of bodies to that of their equilibrium. He applied this principle to the motion of fluids, and gave a specimen of its application at the end of his Dynamics in 1743. It was more fully developed in his Traité des fluides, published in 1744, in which he gave simple and elegant solutions of problems relating to the equilibrium and motion of fluids. He made use of the same suppositions as Daniel Bernoulli, though his calculus was established in a very different manner. He considered, at every instant, the actual motion of a stratum as composed of a motion which it had in the preceding instant and of a motion which it had lost; and the laws of equilibrium between the motions lost furnished him with equations representing the motion of the fluid. It remained a desideratum to express by equations the motion of a particle of the fluid in any assigned direction. These equations were found by d'Alembert from two principles – that a rectangular canal, taken in a mass of fluid in equilibrium, is itself in equilibrium, and that a portion of the fluid, in passing from one place to another, preserves the same volume when the fluid is incompressible, or dilates itself according to a given law when the fluid is elastic. His ingenious method, published in 1752, in his Essai sur la résistance des fluides, was brought to perfection in his Opuscules mathématiques, and was adopted by Leonhard Euler.

Leonhard Euler
The resolution of the questions concerning the motion of fluids was effected by means of Leonhard Euler's partial differential coefficients. This calculus was first applied to the motion of water by d'Alembert, and enabled both him and Euler to represent the theory of fluids in formulae restricted by no particular hypothesis.

Pierre Louis Georges Dubuat
One of the most successful labourers in the science of hydrodynamics at this period was Pierre Louis Georges Dubuat (1734–1809). Following in the steps of the Abbé Charles Bossut (Nouvelles Experiences sur la résistance des fluides, 1777), he published, in 1786, a revised edition of his Principes d'hydraulique, which contains a satisfactory theory of the motion of fluids, founded solely upon experiments. Dubuat considered that if water were a perfect fluid, and the channels in which it flowed infinitely smooth, its motion would be continually accelerated, like that of bodies descending in an inclined plane. But as the motion of rivers is not continually accelerated, and soon arrives at a state of uniformity, it is evident that the viscosity of the water, and the friction of the channel in which it descends, must equal the accelerating force. Dubuat, therefore, assumed it as a proposition of fundamental importance that, when water flows in any channel or bed, the accelerating force which obliges it to move is equal to the sum of all the resistances which it meets with, whether they arise from its own viscosity or from the friction of its bed. This principle was employed by him in the first edition of his work, which appeared in 1779. The theory contained in that edition was founded on the experiments of others, but he soon saw that a theory so new, and leading to results so different from the ordinary theory, should be founded on new experiments more direct than the former, and he was employed in the performance of these from 1780 to 1783. The experiments of Bossut were made only on pipes of a moderate declivity, but Dubuat used declivities of every kind, and made his experiments upon channels of various sizes.

Nineteenth century

Hermann von Helmholtz
In 1858 Hermann von Helmholtz published his seminal paper "Über Integrale der hydrodynamischen Gleichungen, welche den Wirbelbewegungen entsprechen," in Journal für die reine und angewandte Mathematik, vol. 55, pp. 25–55. So important was the paper that a few years later P. G. Tait published an English translation, "On integrals of the hydrodynamical equations which express vortex motion", in Philosophical Magazine, vol. 33, pp. 485–512 (1867). In his paper Helmholtz established his three "laws of vortex motion" in much the same way one finds them in any advanced textbook of fluid mechanics today. This work established the significance of vorticity to fluid mechanics and science in general.

For the next century or so vortex dynamics matured as a subfield of fluid mechanics, always commanding at least a major chapter in treatises on the subject. Thus, H. Lamb's well known Hydrodynamics (6th ed., 1932) devotes a full chapter to vorticity and vortex dynamics as does G. K. Batchelor's Introduction to Fluid Dynamics (1967). In due course entire treatises were devoted to vortex motion. H. Poincaré's Théorie des Tourbillons (1893), H. Villat's Leçons sur la Théorie des Tourbillons (1930), C. Truesdell's The Kinematics of Vorticity (1954), and P. G. Saffman's Vortex Dynamics (1992) may be mentioned. Early on individual sessions at scientific conferences were devoted to vortices, vortex motion, vortex dynamics and vortex flows. Later, entire meetings were devoted to the subject.

The range of applicability of Helmholtz's work grew to encompass atmospheric and oceanographic flows, to all branches of engineering and applied science and, ultimately, to superfluids (today including Bose–Einstein condensates). In modern fluid mechanics the role of vortex dynamics in explaining flow phenomena is firmly established. Well known vortices have acquired names and are regularly depicted in the popular media: hurricanes, tornadoes, waterspouts, aircraft trailing vortices (e.g., wingtip vortices), drainhole vortices (including the bathtub vortex), smoke rings, underwater bubble air rings, cavitation vortices behind ship propellers, and so on. In the technical literature a number of vortices that arise under special conditions also have names: the Kármán vortex street wake behind a bluff body, Taylor vortices between rotating cylinders, Görtler vortices in flow along a curved wall, etc.

Gaspard Riche de Prony
The theory of running water was greatly advanced by the researches of Gaspard Riche de Prony (1755–1839). From a collection of the best experiments by previous workers he selected eighty-two (fifty-one on the velocity of water in conduit pipes, and thirty-one on its velocity in open canals); and, discussing these on physical and mechanical principles, he succeeded in drawing up general formulae, which afforded a simple expression for the velocity of running water.

Johann Albert Eytelwein
J. A. Eytelwein of Berlin, who published in 1801 a valuable compendium of hydraulics entitled Handbuch der Mechanik und der Hydraulik, investigated the subject of the discharge of water by compound pipes, the motions of jets and their impulses against plane and oblique surfaces; and he showed theoretically that a water-wheel will have its maximum effect when its circumference moves with half the velocity of the stream.

Jean Nicolas Pierre Hachette and others
JNP Hachette in 1816–1817 published memoirs containing the results of experiments on the spouting of fluids and the discharge of vessels. His object was to measure the contracted part of a fluid vein, to examine the phenomena attendant on additional tubes, and to investigate the form of the fluid vein and the results obtained when different forms of orifices are employed. Extensive experiments on the discharge of water from orifices (Expériences hydrauliques, Paris, 1832) were conducted under the direction of the French government by J. V. Poncelet (1788–1867) and J. A. Lesbros (1790–1860).

P. P. Boileau (1811–1891) discussed their results and added experiments of his own (Traité de la mesure des eaux courantes, Paris, 1854). K. R. Bornemann re-examined all these results with great care, and gave formulae expressing the variation of the coefficients of discharge in different conditions (Civil Ingénieur, 1880). Julius Weisbach (1806–1871) also made many experimental investigations on the discharge of fluids.

The experiments of J. B. Francis (Lowell Hydraulic Experiments, Boston, Mass., 1855) led him to propose variations in the accepted formulae for the discharge over weirs, and a generation later a very complete investigation of this subject was carried out by Henri-Émile Bazin. An elaborate inquiry on the flow of water in pipes and channels was conducted by Henry G. P. Darcy (1803–1858) and continued by Bazin, at the expense of the French government (Recherches hydrauliques, Paris, 1866).

Andreas Rudolf Harlacher and others
German engineers have also devoted special attention to the measurement of the flow in rivers; the Beiträge zur Hydrographie des Königreiches Böhmen (Prague, 1872–1875) of Andreas Rudolf Harlacher contained valuable measurements of this kind, together with a comparison of the experimental results with the formulae of flow that had been proposed up to the date of its publication, and important data were yielded by the gaugings of the Mississippi made for the United States government by Andrew Atkinson Humphreys and Henry Larcom Abbot, by Robert Gordon's gaugings of the Irrawaddy River, and by Allen J. C. Cunningham's experiments on the Ganges canal. The friction of water, investigated for slow speeds by Coulomb, was measured for higher speeds by William Froude (1810–1879), whose work is of great value in the theory of ship resistance (Brit. Assoc. Report., 1869), and stream line motion was studied by Professor Osborne Reynolds and by Professor Henry S. Hele-Shaw.

Twentieth century

Developments in vortex dynamics
Vortex dynamics is a vibrant subfield of fluid dynamics, commanding attention at major scientific conferences and precipitating workshops and symposia that focus fully on the subject.

A curious diversion in the history of vortex dynamics was the Vortex theory of the atom of William Thomson, later Lord Kelvin. His basic idea was that atoms were to be represented as vortex motions in the ether. This theory predated the quantum theory by several decades and because of the scientific standing of its originator received considerable attention. Many profound insights into vortex dynamics were generated during the pursuit of this theory. Other interesting corollaries were the first counting of simple knots by P. G. Tait, today considered a pioneering effort in graph theory, topology and knot theory. Ultimately, Kelvin's vortex atom was seen to be wrong-headed but the many results in vortex dynamics that it precipitated have stood the test of time. Kelvin himself originated the notion of circulation and proved that in an inviscid fluid circulation around a material contour would be conserved. This result  singled out by Einstein in "Zum hundertjährigen Gedenktag von Lord Kelvins Geburt, Naturwissenschaften, 12 (1924), 601–602," (title translation: "On the 100th Anniversary of Lord Kelvin's Birth"), as one of the most significant results of Kelvin's work provided an early link between fluid dynamics and topology.

The history of vortex dynamics seems particularly rich in discoveries and re-discoveries of important results, because results obtained were entirely forgotten after their discovery and then were re-discovered decades later. Thus, the integrability of the problem of three point vortices on the plane was solved in the 1877 thesis of a young Swiss applied mathematician named Walter Gröbli. In spite of having been written in Göttingen in the general circle of scientists surrounding Helmholtz and Kirchhoff, and in spite of having been mentioned in Kirchhoff's well known lectures on theoretical physics and in other major texts such as Lamb's Hydrodynamics, this solution was largely forgotten. A 1949 paper by the noted applied mathematician J. L. Synge created a brief revival, but Synge's paper was in turn forgotten. A quarter century later a 1975 paper by E. A. Novikov and a 1979 paper by H. Aref on chaotic advection finally brought this important earlier work to light. The subsequent elucidation of chaos in the four-vortex problem, and in the advection of a passive particle by three vortices, made Gröbli's work part of "modern science".

Another example of this kind is the so-called "localized induction approximation" (LIA) for three-dimensional vortex filament motion, which gained favor in the mid-1960s through the work of Arms, Hama, Betchov and others, but turns out to date from the early years of the 20th century in the work of Da Rios, a gifted student of the noted Italian mathematician T. Levi-Civita. Da Rios published his results in several forms but they were never assimilated into the fluid mechanics literature of his time. In 1972 H. Hasimoto used Da Rios' "intrinsic equations" (later re-discovered independently by R. Betchov) to show how the motion of a vortex filament under LIA could be related to the non-linear Schrödinger equation. This immediately made the problem part of "modern science" since it was then realized that vortex filaments can support solitary twist waves of large amplitude.

Further reading 
 J. D. Anderson, Jr. (1997).  A History of Aerodynamics (Cambridge University Press).  
 J. D. Anderson, Jr. (1998).  Some Reflections on the History of Fluid Dynamics, in The Handbook of Fluid Dynamics (ed. by R.W. Johnson, CRC Press) Ch. 2.
 J. S. Calero (2008).  The Genesis of Fluid Mechanics, 1640–1780 (Springer).  
 O. Darrigol  (2005).  Worlds of Flow: A History of Hydrodynamics from the Bernoullis to Prandtl (Oxford University Press).  
 P. A. Davidson, Y. Kaneda, K. Moffatt, and K. R. Sreenivasan (eds, 2011).  A Voyage Through Turbulence (Cambridge University Press).  
 M. Eckert (2006).  The Dawn of Fluid Dynamics: A Discipline Between Science and Technology (Wiley-VCH).  
 G. Garbrecht (ed., 1987).  Hydraulics and Hydraulic Research: A Historical Review (A.A. Balkema).  
 M. J. Lighthill (1995).  Fluid mechanics, in Twentieth Century Physics ed. by L.M. Brown, A. Pais, and B. Pippard (IOP/AIP), Vol. 2, pp. 795–912.
 H. Rouse and S. Ince (1957).  History of Hydraulics (Iowa Institute of Hydraulic Research, State University of Iowa).
 G. A. Tokaty (1994).  A History and Philosophy of Fluid Mechanics (Dover).

References

Fluid dynamics
Fluid mechanics
History of physics